Dayadra is a village in Bharuch district, Gujarat state, India. Its official language is Gujarati. The nearest city is Bharuch.

External links
 India.com, retrieved 29 January 2020

Villages in Bharuch district